Juncal Rivero (born 31 August 1966) is a Spanish model actress. She was Miss Spain 1985 and Miss Europe for 1985–1988 and was a contestant in the Miss World 1984 pageant.

External links
 El Mundo article on Rivero
 article on Rivero

References

1966 births
Living people
Miss Spain winners
Miss Europe winners
Miss World 1984 delegates
20th-century Spanish actresses
21st-century Spanish actresses
Spanish television actresses